Nuria Diosdado (born 22 August 1990, Guadalajara) is a Mexican synchronized swimmer. She competed in the women's duet at the 2012 Olympic Games (with Isabel Delgado) and at the 2016 Olympics (with Karem Achach).

Diosdado took up synchronised swimming at the age of 5, and began to compete at the age of 8.  She won silver medals in the duet (with Achach) and team events at the 2015 Pan-American Games.  She repeated the feat at the 2019 Pan-American Games, this time with Joana Jiménez in the duet.

She has qualified to represent Mexico at the 2020 Summer Olympics with Joana Jiménez.

References 

1990 births
Living people
Mexican synchronized swimmers
Olympic synchronized swimmers of Mexico
Synchronized swimmers at the 2012 Summer Olympics
Synchronized swimmers at the 2016 Summer Olympics
Synchronized swimmers at the 2020 Summer Olympics
Sportspeople from Guadalajara, Jalisco
Synchronized swimmers at the 2015 Pan American Games
Synchronized swimmers at the 2011 Pan American Games
Artistic swimmers at the 2019 Pan American Games
Pan American Games medalists in synchronized swimming
Pan American Games silver medalists for Mexico
Synchronized swimmers at the 2017 World Aquatics Championships
Central American and Caribbean Games gold medalists for Mexico
Competitors at the 2006 Central American and Caribbean Games
Competitors at the 2010 Central American and Caribbean Games
Competitors at the 2014 Central American and Caribbean Games
Artistic swimmers at the 2019 World Aquatics Championships
Central American and Caribbean Games medalists in synchronized swimming
Medalists at the 2015 Pan American Games
Medalists at the 2019 Pan American Games